Barry Michael Avrich (born May 9, 1963) is a Canadian film director, film producer, author, marketing executive, and arts philanthropist. Avrich's film career has included critically acclaimed films about the entertainment business including The Last Mogul about film producer Lew Wasserman (2005), Glitter Palace about the Motion Picture Country Home (2005), and Guilty Pleasure about the Vanity Fair columnist and author Dominick Dunne (2004). In addition, Avrich produced the Gemini-nominated television special Caesar and Cleopatra (2009) with Christopher Plummer. Avrich also produced Canada's Sports Hall of Fame Awards (2015) as well as the Canadian Screen Awards (2015-2017) and The Scotiabank Giller Prize (2015-Current).

Besides films, Avrich has authored three books and one play as well as supporting many leading cultural institutions including The Toronto International Film Festival and the Stratford Festival of Canada. Avrich was responsible for creating the world's first state of the art movie theatre in a children's hospital at the Hospital for Sick Children in Toronto, Ontario. Avrich won the Ernst & Young Entrepreneur of the Year Award in 2008. In 2016, Avrich published his memoir, "Moguls, Monsters and Madmen."

Early life
Avrich was born into a Jewish family in Montreal, Quebec, the son of Irving Avrich, a garment industry executive, and Faye Avrich, a housewife. His parents immersed him in the arts as a child. In school, Avrich produced talent shows and started experimenting with films. While attending Vanier College, he gravitated to the film program and while there, he produced many films. In 1980, he moved to Toronto where he continued to study film, art and theatre at both Ryerson Polytechnical Institute and the University of Toronto. While in school, Avrich started Rent-A-Fan Club, a company that offered "celebrity status" to people as a novelty by using his fellow acting students to create fan clubs. Soon after graduating, Avrich made two short films that would get him noticed: The King of Yorkville (1985) was a satirical parody of the 1980s dating scene that was picked up by local television stations in Canada, and The Madness of Method (1995), featuring M. Emmet Walsh, won a Gold Medal at the Bilbao International Festival of Documentary and Short Films.

Career

Film
Avrich created Melbar Entertainment Group in 1998 to produce documentary films. Avrich has directed and produced over many acclaimed documentaries and television specials. His focus is generally on the entertainment industry and television specials, including the music special, Bowfire for PBS (2008), One x One Gala (2007) for CTV and Caesar and Cleopatra (2009) for Bravo and CTV. Other films have chronicled defense attorney Edward Greenspan and the Rolling Stones promoter Michael Cohl, Winston Churchill, and David Steinberg. His 2010 film Unauthorized: The Harvey Weinstein Project was sold to IFC's Sundance Now channel in February 2011.

In 2017, Avrich announced plans for a docu-series on American financier and convicted sex offender Jeffrey Epstein, however he decided to scrap the project after Epsteins suicide in August, 2019, claiming the topic to be "too distasteful". In 2018, Avrich directed and produced, The Reckoning, the first "#metoo documentary on Harvey Weinstein that premiered at Hot Docs Film Festival and was sold to CBC and Hulu. In 2018, Avrich produced and directed an acclaimed and award winning documentary Prosecuting Evil on Nuremberg prosecutor Ben Ferencz that was sold to Netflix. In 2019, Avrich directed and produced Off The Record, a biography on Grammy award winning producer and composer David Foster for Crave and Netflix which premiered at TIFF. In 2020, Avrich produced Made You Look, a documentary about the infamous Knoedler Gallery art fraud scandal that was sold to Netflix.

In 2021, Avrich directed and produced Oscar Peterson: Black + White, a docu-concert on jazz icon Oscar Peterson that had its world premiere at TIFF on September 12, 2021. In 2022, Avrich began production on three new documentaries; Without Precedent (on Supreme Court Justice Rosalie Abella), Sacrilege (narrated by Brian Cox) and The Palm Beach Diaries.

The Last Mogul (2005) is probably Avrich's best known film to date. The Variety critic Robert Koehler said of the documentary about Lew Wasserman, it "draws a full and balanced measure of the man, from his stratospheric rise to a remarkably humbling fall, and includes as thorough a study of the super-agent-turned-mogul's shady ties with organized crime as any feature docu could hope to muster."

Awards and Controversy
In April 2022, Avrich received a Canadian Screen Award for Best Documentary Program for Oscar Peterson: Black + White. When called up to the mic to make an acceptance speech, his remarks ended with the following statement: "There are so many Black stories in Canada that need to be told. It doesn't matter who tells them, we just need to tell 'em." At least 11 Canadian film-sector organizations issued prompt statements condemning these remarks, including the Black Screen Office, whose statement called out Avrich's "privilege and supreme disrespect of our history" that "cleverly weaponizes the non-Black community"; Reelworld Film Festival, whose statement called out Avrich's words as "reflective of a past system that we are working to change"; and, without naming Avrich, the Academy of Canadian Cinema & Television that is responsible for the Canadian Screen Awards. Avrich's statement the next day said that he had "misspoke" and that "[o]f course, it matters who tells stories."

Business
Avrich began a marketing career in 1985 at Borden Advertising where he worked on national campaigns for the Canadian original production of Les Misérables and Miss Saigon. In 1989, Avrich joined Echo Advertising where he became partner and eventually CEO. While at Echo, Avrich and his staff developed award-winning international campaigns for such clients such as the Toronto International Film Festival, the Rolling Stones, American Express, Sprint and for Broadway productions such as Ragtime, Show Boat, Fosse, Kiss of the Spider Woman and Canadian productions of The Phantom of the Opera, Cats and Les Misérables. Avrich left Echo in 2005 after it was sold to a UK-based marketing firm and he started a boutique advertising agency. In 2009, Avrich won the Ernst & Young Entrepreneur of The Year Award.

Filmography
 The King of Yorkville, 1987
 The Madness of Method, 1996
 Unforgettable: 100 years Remembered, 1998
 Glitter Palace, 2002
 Guilty Pleasure, 2002
 A Criminal Mind, 2005
 Satisfaction, 2006
 City Lights, 2002
 The Madness of King Richard, 2003
 The Last Mogul, 2005
 One x One Gala, 2007
 Bowfire, 2008
 Citizen Cohl, 2008
 The Ultimate Jew, 2009
 Caesar and Cleopatra, 2009
 Amerika Idol, 2009
 Unauthorized: The Harvey Weinstein Story, 2010
 The Tempest, 2010
 An Unlikely Obsession: Churchill and the Jews, 2011
 Show Stopper: The Theatrical Life of Garth Drabinsky, 2012
 Filthy Gorgeous: The Bob Guccione Story , 2013
 Quality Balls The David Steinberg Story, 2013
 Red Alert, 2014 
 King Lear, 2015
 Antony and Cleopatra, 2015
 King John, 2015
 Women Who Act, 2015
 The Man Who Shot Hollywood, 2015 (documentary short)
 The Taming of the Shrew, 2016
 Canadian Screen Awards, 2016 (television)
 Hamlet, 2016
 The Scotia Giller Prize Broadcast, 2016 (television)
 Macbeth, 2016
 Blurred Lines, 2017 (documentary)
 "Prosecuting Evil: The Extraordinary World of Ben Ferencz, 2018 (documentary)   
 David Foster: Off the Record, 2019 (documentary)
 Made You Look: A True Story About Fake Art, 2020
 Howie Mandel: But, Enough About Me, 2020 (Documentary)
 Reversal of Fortune: The Unraveling of Turkey's Democracy, 2020 (Documentary) 
 Othello, 2020
 Merry Wives of Windsor, 2020
 Oscar Peterson: Black + White, 2021
 The Talented Mr. Rosenberg, 2021
 Sacrilege, 2022
 Without Precedent, 2022
 Three Tall Women, 2022

References

Further reading
Event and Entertainment Marketing, 1994, Probus Publishing
Selling The Sizzle, 2002, Lester Publishing
Selling The Sizzle 2, The Sequel, 2005, Lester Publishing
The Madness of Method, 2001, Maxworks Publishing
 Moguls, Monsters, and Madmen  2017, ECW Press

External links
 

1963 births
Living people
20th-century Canadian businesspeople
20th-century Canadian dramatists and playwrights
Businesspeople from Montreal
Canadian advertising executives
Film producers from Quebec
Canadian non-fiction writers
Film directors from Montreal
Philanthropists from Quebec
Writers from Montreal
Canadian male dramatists and playwrights
Canadian television producers
20th-century Canadian male writers
Canadian male non-fiction writers
Canadian documentary film directors
Canadian documentary film producers